Mya Sanda Oo (born ) is a Burmese female former weightlifter, competing in the 64 kg category and representing Myanmar at international competitions. She competed at world championships, most recently at the 1997 World Weightlifting Championships.

She won the bronze medal at the 2002 Asian Games. At the 2006 Asian Games she won the silver medal but was disqualified after she was caught for using the forbidden substance Metabolite.

Major results

References

1976 births
Living people
Burmese female weightlifters
Place of birth missing (living people)
Weightlifters at the 1998 Asian Games
Weightlifters at the 2002 Asian Games
Weightlifters at the 2006 Asian Games
Asian Games medalists in weightlifting
Asian Games bronze medalists for Myanmar
Medalists at the 2002 Asian Games
Doping cases in weightlifting
Burmese sportspeople in doping cases
Southeast Asian Games gold medalists for Myanmar
Southeast Asian Games medalists in weightlifting
Competitors at the 2005 Southeast Asian Games